The Golden City is the third in Fourth Realm Trilogy of dystopian novels written by reclusive author John Twelve Hawks. It was released in the United States on September 8, 2009.

References

2009 American novels
2009 science fiction novels
American science fiction novels
Novels by John Twelve Hawks